This Is How You Lose the Time War is a 2019 science fiction epistolary novel by Amal El-Mohtar and Max Gladstone. It was first published by Simon and Schuster. It won the BSFA Award for Best Shorter Fiction, the Nebula Award for Best Novella of 2019 and the 2020 Hugo Award for Best Novella.

Synopsis
As agents Red and Blue travel back and forth through time, altering the history of multiple universes on behalf of their warring empires, they leave each other secret messages—at first taunting, but gradually developing into flirtation and then love. When Red's commanding officer detects the interaction between Red and Blue, she forces Red to send Blue a message that will kill Blue when it is read. After Blue is killed, Red time-travels to Blue's childhood to give her immunity to the poisoned message, allowing her to survive.

Reception
Publishers Weekly called This Is How You Lose the Time War "exquisitely crafted" and "dazzling", with "increasingly intricate wordplay", and stated that it "warrants multiple readings". National Public Radios Jason Sheehan compared it to The Lake House (if one "strapped [The Lake House] up in body armor, covered it with razors, dipped it in poison and set it loose to murder and burn its way across worlds and centuries"), and said that the book makes a virtue of what he felt to be the characteristic weaknesses of both the time travel genre and the epistolary format.

Cheryl Morgan argued that its central message — "soldiers on either side of a war often have far more in common with each other than they do with the people who sit safely at home and issue orders" — is one "that the world needs to hear". Tor.com's Lee Mandelo considered the book to have "a poetic internal structure", with prose that is "sharp, almost crisp" rather than "lush", and a "focus (...) on the personal as opposed to the global"; Mandelo also observed that it "has an argument to make—several, actually—about conflict, love, and resistance", and treats the time war as "an object lesson, a conceit, the unending and reason-less conflict that consumes generations, centuries, now and forever." Den of Geeks Natalie Zutter praised the novel's approach to gender identity: Red and Blue "both use she/her pronouns, but neither fits the heteronormative mold of femininity", with each "perform(ing) gender in a dozen different ways", such that "(t)he more that (they) appear in different forms, the less their gender actually matters."

At Strange Horizons, Adri Joy noted that "the Time War itself (...) is largely incomprehensible beyond its most basic points", faulting the novel for its paucity of "direct tension" and lack of "coherent picture", and for its "poetic obfuscation" which was "hard to understand" and not "relevant to the story being told here"; however, Joy nonetheless lauded the novel as "an absolute emotional masterpiece, sending readers on a gut-wrenching feelings rollercoaster of the highest calibre." Black Gate found it to be neither  "a riddle to parse" nor "a tangled, hard sci-fi puzzle-box of time travel to unravel", with its final revelation being "fairly obvious from the first chapter", but emphasized that the revelation in question was nonetheless "quite emotionally fulfilling", ultimately concluding that "it's fun to watch goddesses fall in love (...) and Blue and Red feel very much human."

Awards 
This Is How You Lose the Time War won the BSFA Award for Best Shorter Fiction, the Nebula Award for Best Novella of 2019, the 2020 Locus Award for Best Novella, the 2020 Hugo Award for Best Novella, the 2020 Prix Aurora Award for short fiction, and was a finalist for the 2019 Shirley Jackson Award in the Novella category. Additionally, it was a finalist for the inaugural Ray Bradbury Award for Science Fiction, Fantasy & Speculative Fiction at the 2019 Los Angeles Times Book Prizes; and for the 2019 Kitschies in the Novel category;  and achieved second place in the 2020 Theodore Sturgeon Memorial Award.

Creation

Red's letters were written entirely by Gladstone, and Blue's by El-Mohtar; although they wrote a general outline beforehand, "the reactions of each character were developed with a genuine element of surprise on receiving each letter, and the scenes accompanying [the letters] were written using that emotional response".

Adaptation
El-Mohtar announced in 2019 that the book has been optioned for television, with scripts to be written by herself and Gladstone; she also specified that the genders of the characters "are not up for negotiation".

References

External links
Audio interview with Amal El-Mohtar, at CBC.ca

2019 American novels
2019 Canadian novels
Novels about time travel
Temporal war fiction
Epistolary novels
Collaborative novels
LGBT speculative fiction novels
Saga Press books
Nebula Award for Best Novella-winning works
Hugo Award for Best Novella winning works
Canadian LGBT novels
2019 science fiction novels